Events in the year 1928 in Portugal.

Incumbents
President: Óscar Carmona
Prime Minister: Óscar Carmona; José Vicente de Freitas

Events
 March - Presidential election.
 1 June - Driving on the right side introduced in Portugal (5 o'clock in the morning) 
Federação Escotista de Portugal founded

Arts and entertainment

Sports
30 June - 1928 Campeonato de Portugal Final
5 August – Portugal won a bronze medal in men's fencing, team épée, at the Summer Olympics 
C.F. Os Belenenses founded

Births

Deaths

29 June – Álvaro de Castro, politician (born 1878)

References

 
1920s in Portugal
Portugal
Years of the 20th century in Portugal
Portugal